Acosmeryx sinjaevi, the southern gliding hawkmoth, is a moth of the family Sphingidae. It was described by Ron Brechlin and Ian J. Kitching in 1996 and is known from northern Vietnam and Hainan and Fujian, China.

References

Acosmeryx
Moths described in 1996
Moths of Asia